Women's Prison is a 1955 American film noir crime film directed by Lewis Seiler and starring Ida Lupino, Jan Sterling, Cleo Moore, Audrey Totter, Phyllis Thaxter and Howard Duff.

The film is noted today for the appearance of Moore, and for Lupino's performance as the aggressively cruel warden.  In the 1980s the film became rather popular, Sony Pictures subsequently released it in the boxed set Bad Girls of Film Noir: Volume II along with Night Editor, One Girl's Confession and Over-Exposed.

Plot
A ruthless superintendent of a prison, Amelia van Zandt, makes life hell for the female inmates. Her rules are rigid and she makes no exceptions.

The newcomer Helene Jensen is not a hardened criminal by any means, but a woman convicted of vehicular homicide after she accidentally killed a child. Out of place here, Helene is so distraught that Van Zandt has her placed in solitary confinement. When Helene goes into hysterics, Van Zandt has her put in a straitjacket. Helene nearly dies.

The prison has two wings, one for women, one for men. One of the inmates, Joan Burton, has been illicitly having conjugal relations late at night with her husband, Glen, a convict in the other wing. Now she is expecting a baby, and brutal men's warden Brock issues a stern warning to Van Zandt that she'd better find out how the two prisoners have been arranging these meetings.

Joan has the sympathy of the decent Dr. Crane who's in charge of the infirmary and disapproves of the cruel treatment of prisoners he sees. But the heartless Van Zandt goes into a literally homicidal rage while interrogating Joan about how Glen managed to visit her, beating the pregnant prisoner to the point of death. Dr. Crane tells Van Zandt and Brock that he will resign after treating her, and report them. Glen manages to sneak into the infirmary, where Crane lets him talk to Joan; she envisions their bright future with their baby after both have done their time, and dies.

A protest erupts in the women's cell block, beginning with a hunger strike organized by Joan's cell mate, Brenda Martin, then turning into a full-scale riot. Naive or timid inmates are swept up along with the vicious, veteran ones. Van Zandt is captured by the inmates; Dr. Crane pleads with them to leave it to the authorities to punish her for Joan's murder, but they refuse and menace her till the guards shoot tear gas and bullets into the wing. Glen, who has obtained a gun, comes looking for Van Zandt to kill her. She flees desperately from Glen, the other inmates and the gas, and Glen, wounded by the guards, confronts her with his gun in the padded cell she had put Helene in. Dr. Crane bursts in just in time to point out to Glen that the ordeal has driven her mad and he need not shoot her; raving, she is put in a straitjacket and taken away. Dr. Crane tells Brock he will no longer be warden after the prison board meets the next day. Helene is released and joyfully reunited with her husband.

Cast
 Ida Lupino as Amelia van Zandt
 Jan Sterling as Brenda Martin
 Cleo Moore as Mae
 Audrey Totter as Joan Burton
 Phyllis Thaxter as Helene Jensen
 Howard Duff as Dr. Crane
 Warren Stevens as Glen Burton
 Barry Kelley as Warden Brock
 Gertrude Michael as Matron Sturgess
 Vivian Marshall as Dottie LaRose
 Mae Clarke as Matron Saunders
 Ross Elliott as Don Jensen
 Adelle August as Grace
 Don C. Harvey as Chief Guard Tierney
 Juanita Moore as Polyclinic "Polly" Jones
 Edna Holland as Sarah Graham

Reception
The staff at Variety praised some of the actors in the film, "Sterling scores nicely as a tough moll, Cleo Moore is a typical femme inmate and Vivian Marshall, as an ex-stripteaser gone wrong, shines in some amusing impersonations."

See also
List of American films of 1955

References

External links
 
 
 
 
 

1955 films
1955 crime films
American crime films
Columbia Pictures films
Film noir
Films directed by Lewis Seiler
Films set in prison
Women in prison films
1950s prison films
1950s English-language films
1950s American films
American black-and-white films